David Pountney (born 12 October 1939) is an English former footballer. He played in The Football League for Shrewsbury Town, Aston Villa and Chester City. He played in several positions including winger and wing half.

Playing career
Pountney spent six years with Shrewsbury Town after signing in 1957 before making a £20,000 move to Football League First Division side Aston Villa in October 1963. Five years later he returned to Shrewsbury, combining playing with establishing his own sports business that he continues to own today.

In 1970, Pountney moved to Chester and made an immediate impact by scoring from 35 yards to help his new employers eliminate Shrewsbury from the Football League Cup. After leaving Chester at the end of the 1972–73 season, Pountney played for non–league sides Oswestry Town and Welshpool Town.

References

External links
Feature on leading players from Shropshire including Pountney

1939 births
English footballers
Living people
Footballers from Shropshire
English Football League players
Association football defenders
Association football wingers
Shrewsbury Town F.C. players
Aston Villa F.C. players
Chester City F.C. players
Oswestry Town F.C. players
Welshpool Town F.C. players
Oswestry Town F.C. managers
English football managers